Dolores Kendrick (September 7, 1927 – November 7, 2017) was an American poet, and served as the second Poet Laureate of the District of Columbia.
Her book The Women of Plums: Poems in the Voices of Slave Women won the Anisfield-Wolf Award.

Biography
Dolores Teresa Kendrick was born on September 7, 1927, in Washington, DC. to parents Josephine, a musician and teacher, and Robert "Ike", founder and publisher of the Capitol Spotlight. She grew up in the LeDroit Park neighborhood near Howard University.  She attended Dunbar High School where she began writing poetry, and went on to Miners Teachers College to study English. She earned a master's degree in linguistics from Georgetown University in 1970 as part of the Experienced Teacher Fellowship Program. She designed the humanities curriculum for D.C.'s School Without Walls. In 1963 she received a Fulbright exchange in Belfast, Northern Ireland.

Kendrick was a Vira I. Heinz Professor Emerita at Phillips Exeter Academy.

She adapted The Women of Plums for the theater, which won the 1997 New York New Playwrights Award.

She adapted The Women of Plums into a CD, The Color of Dusk, with Wall Matthews and Aleta Greene.

Kendrick died at her Washington, D.C. home on November 7, 2017, aged 90, from complications of cancer.

Works
Through the Ceiling, Paul Breman Limited, 1975
Now Is the Thing to Praise, Lotus Press, 1984, 
The Women of Plums: Poems in the Voices of Slave Women, Phillips Exeter Academy Press, 1990, 
Why the woman is singing on the corner: a verse narrative, Peter E. Randall Publisher, 2001,

Awards and honors

 1963: Fulbright Teacher Exchange Program, Belfast, Northern Ireland
 1965: Deep South Writers' Award for narrative poem "Freddie"
 1967: Visiting Master, 'Iolani School, Honolulu, Hawai'i
 1981: Poet-in-Residence at Holy Cross College, Worcester, Massachusetts
 1988: Creative Writing Fellowship, National Endowment for the Arts
 1990: Anisfield-Wolf Book Award for The Women of Plums
 1997: New York New Playwrights Award for her stage adaptation of The Women of Plums
 1999: Named Poet Laureate of the District of Columbia
 2005: Inducted into the Washington, D.C. Hall of Fame in the cultural arts category

References

External links

"The 3-minute interview: Dolores Kendrick", The Washington Examiner, Scott McCabe, January 31, 2008
A Poem for Mom, Set to Her Favorite Opera, NPR, May 9, 2005
"Review: Dolores Kendrick's The Women of Plums: Poems in the Voices of Slave Women (William Morrow Company, Inc. 1989)"
"Poetry of Levine & Kendrick". The Library of Congress Webcasts.

1927 births
2017 deaths
American women poets
African-American poets
Catholic poets
Deaths from cancer in Washington, D.C.
Georgetown University alumni
Poets from Washington, D.C.
Poets Laureate of the District of Columbia
Phillips Exeter Academy faculty
American women educators
20th-century American women
21st-century American women
20th-century African-American women
20th-century African-American people
21st-century African-American women
20th-century American poets
21st-century American poets